The mandora or gallichon is a type of 18th- and early 19th-century lute, with six to nine courses of strings. The terms were interchangeable, with mandora more commonly used from the mid-18th century onwards.

History

Mandora or gallichon generally refers to a bass lute from the 1700s, with a vibrating string length of 72 centimeters or greater, used in Germany and Bohemia. It could be either single- or double-strung.

James Tyler pointed out in his book The Early Mandolin that the word mandora was rarely encountered before the 18th century. Then, it referred to a large bass lute. The gallichone, as it was better known, was a type of 6 or 8-course bass lute (possibly a descendant of the guiterne and/or chitarra italiana) used, mainly for basso continuo, in Germany, Austria and Bohemia particularly during the 18th and early 19th centuries. It was also called the galizona, galichon or caledon. Tyler disputed that it was mainly used for continuo, saying it was used "both as a solo and as a continuo instrument". The instrument was popular in the 18th century and there are various surviving instruments and manuscript sources (see below), mainly from Germany. The mandora often had only 6 courses, resulting in a simpler technique than the complex and difficult 13-course lute, so was more suitable for amateur players. Similar instruments were also in use in northern Italy, although generally referred to as "liuto" (lute) rather than mandora.

Composers for the gallichon/mandora include Johann Paul Schiffelholz and Telemann, as well as Ruggero Chiesa in the modern era (1933-1993). Chiesa called the instrument the colascione, incorrectly as the colascione is a different instrument. Gottfried Finger suggested that it was used in Boheman musical circles. The mandora was still in use in the early 19th century, particularly in Vienna and the Bavarian town Eichstätt. The Viennese guitarist Simon Molitor mentions the mandora several times in his early 19th century writings and says that by that time mandoras had 8 single strings.

Construction

The bass type, similarly to the theorbo and other baroque lutes, has a vaulted body (shell) constructed of separate ribs, a flat soundboard with either a carved rose or one which is inset into the soundhole, and a bridge (without a saddle) consisting of a wooden bar acting as a string-holder glued to the soundboard. Unique to this instrument is the neck, which is long enough to allow for ten to 12 tied gut frets. The pegbox is either straight and set at a sharp angle to the neck (much like a lute pegbox), or gently curving and set at a shallow angle, either case being fitted with laterally-inserted tuning pegs (although sometimes a flat pegboard with sagittal pegs is found). The strings were of gut and are strung either singly or, especially on Italian instruments, in double courses. However, on German-made instruments, the first course (highest in pitch) is usually single (a chanterelle) and often has its own separate raised peg rider/holder attached to the pegbox. The number of courses varies from six to eight. Open string lengths tend to be fairly long (62–72 cm) on German instruments, but shorter (55–65 cm) on late Italian ones, probably because they tended to be tuned to a higher pitch.

Luthiers who produced mandoras in the first half of the 18th century were Gregor Ferdinand Wenger in Augsburg, Jacob Goldt of Hamburg, Jacob Weiss of Salzburg, David Buchstetter of Regensburg and Mattias Greisser of Innsbruck. Italian-style instruments are represented by Martino Hell of Genoa, Enrico Ebar of Venice, David Tecchler of Rome, Antonio Scoti of Milan and, toward the end of the century, Antonio Monzino and Giuseppe Presbler of Milan.

At least 50 original instruments survive in collections around the world. Examples are found in museums in Berlin, Claremont (California), Copenhagen, Edinburgh, The Hague, Leipzig, Milan, Munich and Paris, New York and St. Petersburg. Many of these instruments are found in a more or less unaltered state, and therefore are often used as models for modern reconstructions.

Tuning
In the 18th century, mandora was the name of a six-course lute instrument of about 70 cm string 
length, tuned high-to-low d' - a - f - c - G - F or e' - b - g - d - A - E (rarely with two or three additional bass courses). With the former tuning, the instrument was called Calichon or Galichon in Bohemia.

Around 1800, a mutual interchange between the mandora and the guitar took place. The guitar, which had so far been tuned in re-entrant tuning (e' - b - g - d' - a), took over the 6th course and the tuning of the mandora (e' - b - g - d - A - G, later also e' - b - g - d - A - E), whereas the mandora took over the stringing with single strings instead of courses, as had been introduced to the guitar. The so-called wandervogellaute has been a late heir to that development.

From another source on tuning:

Two tunings are reported: a ‘galizona’ or ‘colachon’ is tuned A'( or ) –B'( or ) –C–D–G–c–e–a, and, under a separate heading, ‘mandora’ is given as D ( or ) –E ( or ) –F–G–c–f–a–d' (i.e. the same tuning but a 4th higher) or E–A–d–g–b–e' (identical to that of the modern guitar)

The playing technique for the mandora involves the same basic right-hand finger style as for all 18th-century lutes and, because of the tuning intervals of the upper five courses, a left-hand technique that is similar to that of the 18th-century guitar.

Works

There are about 55 sources of mandora music in tablature, all in manuscript (none printed) and nearly all of Germanic origin. These contain solos, duets, song accompaniments, and chamber music. Few studies have appeared and very little of the music has been transcribed and published: critical editions are especially rare. Many have no composers attributed but in recent years studies of concordances are beginning to uncover music by composers such as Silvius Leopold Weiss and Johann Anton Logy. The sources do mention some composers' names; Duke Clement of Bavaria, Johann Paul Schiffelholz, Joseph (Josef) Michael Zink, Andrea Mayr, Giuseppe Antonio Brescianello and others. Other composers include Georg Philipp Telemann who wrote 6 concerti for flute, gallichon and strings,  and Johann Albrechtsberger, whose three concertinos for ‘mandora’, ‘crembalum’ (jaw harp) and strings have been performed and recorded. Today there are various modern lutenists who play the mandora and some of these historical works have been recorded. The mandora has also been used in contemporary music, the British lutenist and composer Chris Hirst uses the mandora extensively in his works, often in combination with diverse instruments like the cello, cor anglais and melodica.

See also
 Kobza — Ukrainian lute family instrument relating to Mandora.
 Lute guitar — German guitar family instrument setup on a lute bowl, sometimes converted from lute.

Sources

Further reading
E.G. Baron: Historisch-theoretisch und practische Untersuchung des Instruments der Lauten (Nuremberg, 1727/R; Eng. trans., 1976)
C. Sachs: Real-Lexikon der Musikinstrumente (Berlin, 1913/R, enlarged 2/1964)
A. Koczirz: ‘Zur Geschichte der Mandorlaute’, Die Gitarre, ii (1920–21), 21–36
R. Lück: ‘Zur Geschichte der Basslauten-Instrumente Colascione und Calichon’, DJbM, v (1960), 67–75
J. Klima: ‘Gitarre und Mandora, die Lauteninstrumente der Volksmusik’, ÖMz, xviii (1963), 72–7
R. Lück: ‘Zwei unbekannte Basslauten-Instrumente: der italienische Colascione und der deutsche Calichon’, NZM, cxxvi (1965), 10–13
E. Pohlmann: Laute, Theorbe, Chitarrone (Bremen, 1968, enlarged 5/1982)
M. Hodgson: ‘The Identity of 18th Century 6 Course “Lutes”’, FoMRHI Quarterly, no.14 (1979), 25–7
M. Hodgson: ‘The Development of the Callachon’, FoMRHI Quarterly, no.15 (1979), 35–7
D. Gill: ‘Mandore and Calachon’, FoMRHI Quarterly, no.19 (1980), 61–3
J. Tyler: The Early Guitar (London, 1980)
D. Gill: ‘Mandores and Colachons’, GSJ, xxxiv (1981), 130–41
D. Gill: ‘Alternative Lutes: the Identity of 18th-Century Mandores and Gallichones’, The Lute, xxvi (1986), 51–62
P. Prosser: ‘Uno sconosciuto metodo manoscritto (1756) Considerazioni sull'identificazione della mandora nell XVIII secolo’, Strumenti per Mozart, ed. M. Tiella and R. Romano (Rovereto, 1991), 293–335 
D. Kirsch and L. Meierott, eds: Berliner Lautentabulaturen in Krakau (Mainz, 1992)
D. Kirsch: ‘Musik für Mandora in der Universitätsbibliothek Eichstätt’, Sammelblatt Historischer Verein Eichstätt, liiivi (1993), 14–19 
D. Kirsch: ‘Die Mandora in Österreich zur Bestimmung eines Lautentyps des 18. Jahrhunderts’, Vom Pasqualatihaus, iv (1994), 63–81 
P. Prosser: Calichon e mandora nel Settecento: Con un catalogo tematico del repertorio solistico (diss., U. of Pavia, 1996)
D. Rebuffa: Mandora e Calichon, in "Il Liuto", L'Epos, Palermo 2012, pp. 397-423
M. Gioielli: 'Quattro Colascionate', Utriculus, X, n. 39, luglio-settembre 2006, pp. 18–39. at maurogioielli.net 
S. Morey: Mandolins of the 18th century (Cremona, 1993)
  (see back issues. also available translation in Japanese)

External links

 A video of an early 19th century type mandora, as described by Molitor in 1812.
Pictures of a modern calichon, recreating one built in 1756.
Website with some information on the "gallichone or mandora".
Reproduction 18th century mandoras.
Colascione e mandola molisane at maurogioielli.net 

Lutes
Early musical instruments
Necked bowl lutes